Of All Things I Will Soon Grow Tired is the second studio album by American punk rock band Joyce Manor released on April 14, 2012.

The artwork for Of All Things I Will Soon Grow Tired was inspired by GI and What We Do Is Secret by the Germs. This album also contains a cover of The Buggles' 1979 single "Video Killed the Radio Star".

Track listing

Personnel
Joyce Manor
 Barry Johnson - vocals/guitar
 Matt Ebert - bass/vocals
 Chase Knobbe - guitar
 Kurt Walcher - drums

References

2012 albums
Asian Man Records albums
Big Scary Monsters Recording Company albums
Joyce Manor albums
Albums produced by Jack Shirley